The 46th Karlovy Vary International Film Festival took place from 1 to 9 July 2011. The Crystal Globe was won by Restoration, an Israeli drama film directed by Yossi Madmoni. The second prize, the Special Jury Prize was won by Gypsy, a Slovakian drama film directed by Martin Šulík. Hungarian film director, screenwriter, and opera director István Szabó was the Grand Jury President of the festival.

Juries
The following people formed the juries of the festival: 
Main competition
István Szabó, Grand Jury President (Hungary)
 Vladimír Balko (Slovakia)
Michel Ciment (France)
 Michel Demopoulos (Greece)
 Edna Fainaru (Israel)
Sibel Kekilli (Germany)
 Pavel Strnad (Czech Republic)
Documentaries
Amir Bar-Lev, Chairman (USA)
Pietro Marcello (Italy) 
 Freddy Olsson (Sweden)
 Harri Römpötti (Finland)
 Andrea Slováková (Slovakia)
East of the West
 Rossitsa Valkanova, Chairwoman (Bulgaria)
 Sitora Alieva (Russia)
Stefan Arsenijević (Serbia)
 Matthieu Darras (France)
 Łukasz Dzięcioł (Poland)

Official selection awards

The following feature films and people received the official selection awards:
 Crystal Globe (Grand Prix) -  Restoration (Boker Tov Adon Fidelman) by Yossi Madmoni (Israel)
 Special Jury Prize -  Gypsy (Cigán) by Martin Šulík (Slovak Republic, Czech Republic)
 Best Director Award - Pascal Rabaté for Holidays by the Sea (Ni à vendre ni à louer) (France)
 Best Actress Award - Stine Fischer Christensen for her role in Cracks in the Shell (Die Unsichtbare) (Denmark)
 Best Actor Award - David Morse for his role in Collaborator (Canada, USA)
 Special mention of the jury - Ján Mižigár for his role in Gypsy (Cigán) by Martin Šulík (Slovak Republic, Czech Republic)

Other statutory awards
Other statutory awards that were conferred at the festival:
 Best documentary film (over 30 min) -  Familia by Mikael Wiström & Alberto Herskovits (Sweden)
 Special Mention -  Tinar by Mahdi Moniri (Iran)
 Best documentary film (under 30 min) -  The River (Upe) by Julia Gruodienė & Rimantas Gruodis (Lithuania)
 East of the West Award - Aurora by Cristi Puiu (Romania, France, Switzerland, Germany)
 Special Mention -  The Temptation of St. Tony (Püha Tõnu kiusamine) by Veiko Õunpuu (Estonia, Sweden, Finland)
 Crystal Globe for Outstanding Artistic Contribution to World Cinema - Dame Judi Dench (United Kingdom)
 Festival President's Award - Jude Law (United Kingdom)
 Právo Audience Award - Oldboys by Nikolaj Steen (Denmark)

Non-statutory awards
The following non-statutory awards were conferred at the festival:
 FIPRESCI International Critics Award: Hitler in Hollywood (Hitler à Hollywood) by Frédéric Sojcher (Belgium, France, Italy)
 Ecumenical Jury Award: Another Sky (Drugoje něbo) by Dmitri Mamulia (Russia)
 FICC - The Don Quixote Prize: Gypsy (Cigán) by Martin Šulík (Slovak Republic, Czech Republic)
 Special Mention: Lollipop Monster by Ziska Riemann (Germany)
 FEDEORA Award (East of the West section): Marija´s Own (Marijine) 
 Europa Cinemas Label: Gypsy (Cigán) by Martin Šulík (Slovak Republic, Czech Republic)
 NETPAC Award (ex aequo): Once Upon a Time in Anatolia (Bir Zamanlar Anadolu’da) by Nuri Bilge Ceylan (Turkey, Bosnia and Herzegovina)

References

2011 film awards
Karlovy Vary International Film Festival